[[Image:CrewOnRoyalYard.jpg|thumb|right|The fore royal yard on the Prince William. Prince Williams royal yards are the highest and smallest yards on the ship, are made of wood, and are "lifting yards" that can be raised along a section of the mast. Here it is in the lowered position.]]

A yard''' is a spar on a mast from which sails are set. It may be constructed of timber or steel or from more modern materials such as aluminium or carbon fibre. Although some types of fore and aft rigs have yards, the term is usually used to describe the horizontal spars used on square rigged sails. In addition, for some decades after square sails were generally dispensed with, some yards were retained for deploying wireless (radio) aerials and signal flags.

 Parts of the yard 

 Bunt  The short section of the yard between the slings that attach it to the mast.
 Quarters  The port and starboard quarters form the bulk of the yard, extending from the slings to the fittings for the lifts and braces.
 Yardarms  The outermost tips of the yard: outboard from the attachments for the lifts.

Note that these terms refer to stretches of the same spar, not to separate component parts.

 Controlling the yard 

The yard can rotate around the mast to allow the direction of the vessel to be changed relative to the wind. When running directly downwind the yards are 'squared', pointing horizontal to the ship's centre line. As the ship is steered closer to the wind the yards are braced round using the braces. When further rotation is obstructed by other bits of rigging (typically the shrouds), the yard is said to be braced "hard round" or "sharp up", as in "sharp up to port". This angle (normally about 60 degrees) limits how close to the wind a square rigged ship can sail.

The yards represent a considerable weight high above the vessel's centre of gravity; to increase stability, especially in heavy weather, some means is normally provided to lower some of the yards when they are not being used to set sails. In nineteenth-century warships (where a large crew was available) this was generally by physically "sending down" the upper yards from the masts and storing them on deck—along with, in many cases, the upper sections of the mast itself. Merchant ships in the age of sail would also do this before sailing in the Southern Ocean. On modern tall ships the yards are not designed to be sent down on deck, but 'lifting yards' that can be raised and lowered along a short section of mast using a halyard are often used.

 Going aloft 
In order to set and stow the square sails, the crew must climb aloft and spread out along the yards. To do this, they stand in footropes suspended beneath the yard and balance themselves between that and the yard itself. The person working on the end of the yardarm has a separate footrope known as the flemish horse. Jackstays run along the top of the yard - the sail will be bent on to one of them, but a second one is often provided (particularly on larger yards) for the crew to hold on to. These are usually steel rods, but stiff cordage stretched between the yardarms was used in the past.

Almost all ships used in modern times are fitted with steel safety wires (sometimes erroneously called jackstays) along the yards to which sailors attach themselves using a harness. This is a relatively recent innovation - cargo-carrying and naval sailing ships were not so equipped and falling from the yard represented a real (though less than commonly imagined) risk.

 Setting square sails 

The yard exists to allow square sails to be set to drive the ship. The top edge of the sail is 'bent on' (attached) to the yard semi-permanently. Clewlines and buntlines are led along the yard and from there to the mast and down to the deck. These allow the bottom of the sail to be hoisted up to the yard, so the sail is effectively folded in two. In this state the sail is said to be "in its gear", that is ready for setting or stowing. To set the sail the clewlines and buntlines are let go, and the sheets (attached to the bottom corners - clews - of the sail) are adjusted to shape the sail to best catch the wind.  A device called a "tye", a "tye chain", or a "tye rope" is used for lifting a given yard to the top of its travel to set the sail.

To stop using (i.e., to "hand") the sail, the sheets are released and the clewlines and buntlines are pulled tight. The sail folds in half - back in its gear - and so no longer catches the wind. Unless the sail is to be used again very soon, the next step is to "stow" it. To do this, the crew must go out along the yard in order to bundle the sail up tightly and tie it down with gaskets.

 Manning the yards 

When coming into port, especially during the Tall Ships' Races many modern square riggers will 'man the yards'. All the crew not required on deck to handle the ship will go aloft and spread out along the yards. This manoeuvre was originally used to display the whole crew to the harbour authorities and the other ships present, to show that the ship's guns were not manned and hence her intentions were peaceful.

 Fore and aft yards 
As well as the square-rig yard, the traditional lateen rig is a triangular sail rigged fore and aft from a long yard mounted at an angle (downward sloping forward) from the mast. As well, some smaller fore and aft rigs use a yard. The spar at the head of a lug sail – a roughly square sail which is set fore-and-aft but requires different handling from a more modern gaff or Bermuda rig – is known as a yard, and probably developed from the original square-rig yard. The spar at the head of a gunter-rigged sail serves the function of a running topmast, but is not given that name. Some would call it a 'gaff', while others would use the name 'yard'.

"Sun over the yardarm"

This phrase is widely used, both afloat and ashore, to indicate that the time of day has been reached at which it is acceptable, variously, to have lunch or (more commonly) to have an alcoholic beverage. In modern parlance, the latter usage typically refers to early evening, but the phrase is thought originally to have referred to late morning and to the sun's ascent past a particular yard.

The actual time that the sun would pass a particular yard would depend greatly on the ship's latitude and heading, as well as the height of her masts, but the phrase seems to have originated in the north Atlantic, where, in summer, this would have typically been at about 11 a.m. This was the time at which, by custom and rule, the first rum "tot" of the day was issued to men (the senior rates had their tots neat, while the junior rates had theirs diluted with water), hence its connection with taking one's first alcoholic drink of the day.

The earliest mention of this phrase collected by the OED is in Rudyard Kipling's From Sea to Sea in 1899, where it is used as a metaphor referring to drinking habits.  However, the phrase was in use earlier, in the same context.  One example is from the first volume of Life, from the issue of May 31, 1883.

See also
 Full-rigged ship
 Glossary of nautical terms (A-L)
 Glossary of nautical terms (M-Z)
 Lateen
 Square rig
 Squaring a yard
 Lugger

References

 Anon. B.R. 67(1/51), Manual of Seamanship Volume I'' (1951) HMSO
 M.Quinion (2000), "World Wide Words", retrieved 3 May 2006.

Shipbuilding
Nautical terminology
Sailing rigs and rigging